Hollands Glorie: Luv' is a budget-priced compilation album by Dutch girl group Luv' released by CNR Records in 2002. It features hit singles scored in the charts between 1979 and 1981: "Ooh, Yes I Do", "Ann-Maria", "One More Little Kissie", "My Number One" and "Tingalingaling". These songs originate from their studio albums True Luv' (1979) and Forever Yours (1980). They are part of the CNR back catalogue and are licensed from Hans van Hemert productions, except the "Megamix '93" renamed "Hit-medley (Megamix)".

Track listing
All tracks written by Hans van Hemert and Piet Souer under the pseudonym 'Janschen & Janschens', except where noted.

 "My Number One" – 3:11
 Taken from the album Forever Yours (1980)
 "One More Little Kissie" – 3:46
 Taken from the album Forever Yours (1980)
 "Tingalingaling" – 2:31
 Taken from the album Forever Yours (1980)
 "Ann-Maria (Piet Souer) – 4:41
 Taken from the album True Luv' (1979)
 "Rhythm 'n' Shoes (Hans van Hemert) – 3:07
 Taken from the album True Luv' (1979)
 "Ooh, Yes I Do" (van Hemert) – 2:58
 Taken from the album True Luv' (1979)
"Never Wanted to Be..." – 4:34
 Taken from the album Forever Yours (1980)
"Cloud Nr. 9" (van Hemert) – 3:25
 Taken from the album True Luv' (1979)
 "Boys Goodnight" (Souer) – 2:40
 Taken from the album True Luv' (1979)
"Flash" (van Hemert) – 3:51
 Taken from the album True Luv' (1979)
"I Win It" – 3:05
 Taken from the album Forever Yours (1980)
"Some Call It Happiness" – 3:09
 Taken from the album Forever Yours (1980)
 "Wine, Women and Sing" (van Hemert) – 3:45
 Taken from the album True Luv' (1979)
"Getaway" (Souer) – 3:03
 Taken from the album True Luv' (1979)
"Stop Me" (Souer) – 3:09
 Taken from the album True Luv' (1979)
"Let There Be Love" – 2:39
 Taken from the album True Luv' (1979)
 "Billy the Kid" – 3:16
 Taken from the album Forever Yours (1980)
 "Hit-medley (Megamix)" – 2:49
 Radio version. ("U.O.me (Waldolala)"/"Trojan Horse"/"You're the Greatest Lover"/"Ooh, Yes I Do")

Personnel
 José Hoebee – vocals
 Patty Brard – vocals
 Marga Scheide – vocals
 Ria Thielsch – vocals

Production
 Hans van Hemert – producer, songwriter
 Piet Souer – arranger/conductor, songwriter

References

External links
 Detailed Luv' discography at Rate Your Music
 Detailed Luv' discography at Discogs

Luv' albums
2002 greatest hits albums